A Doctor of Philosophy by publication (also known as a Ph.D. by Published Work, PhD by portfolio or Ph.D. under Special Regulation) is a manner of awarding a Ph.D. degree offered by some universities in which a series of articles usually with a common theme are published in scholarly, peer-reviewed journals to meet the requirements for the degree, in lieu of presentation of a final dissertation.  Many PhD by Publication programs require the submission of a formal thesis and a viva voce.

Program
In general, awarding of the Ph.D. requires an original contribution to human knowledge. This is typically achieved through a period of research culminating in the presentation and examination of a major dissertation on an approved subject, and may be preceded by one or more years of formal coursework on research methodology and academic writing. A Ph.D. awarded "by publication", by contrast, may not require any formal coursework and does not necessitate preparation of a dissertation. Instead, the candidate proves the past publication of several quality articles in peer-reviewed, scholarly journals which, in the opinion of the degree-granting university, represent an original contribution to human knowledge equal to that which would be demonstrated by a dissertation. Notwithstanding many PhD by Publication programs require a viva voce, and the submission of a formal thesis.

The PhD by publication may involve either the demonstration of work previously published prior to application to the program, or the achievement of publications during the period of enrollment, or some combination of the two.

In a 2018 study, it was found that recent doctorates awarded by publication in Australia involved the publication of an average of 4.5 journal articles, though some were awarded with as few as one article published, and others with as many as twelve.

Examples
At the University of Cambridge, the doctor of philosophy may be awarded "under the special regulations" only to alumni of Cambridge who can prove the publication of works constituting "a significant contribution to scholarship" and to which are appended an original statement "summarizing the rationale behind the works submitted". Like conventional doctoral students, the candidate must present an oral defense of his or her work before a committee of examiners. According to the university, "the standard required for the PhD Degree under the Special
Regulations is the same for the PhD Degree awarded to a Graduate Student on the submission of a dissertation embodying the results of three years of research".

Notable recipients
Notable recipients of Ph.D.'s by publication include:
 Alexander Macmillan (from the University of Cambridge)
 Mary Ellen O'Connell (from the University of Cambridge)
 Aubrey de Grey (from the University of Cambridge)
 Peter Bellwood (from the University of Cambridge)
 John Mulvaney (from the University of Cambridge)
 Ludwig Wittgenstein (from the University of Cambridge)
 Christopher Catherwood (from the University of East Anglia)
 Josephine Balmer (from the University of East Anglia)
 Graham Joyce (from Nottingham Trent University)
 Wendy McMurdo (from the University of Westminster)
 Bryn Harrison (from the University of Huddersfield)
 Celia Brayfield (from Brunel University)
 Paul S Davies (from the University of Cambridge)

References

Doctoral degrees
Higher education in Australia
Higher education in England